The Toronto Argonauts are a professional Canadian football team based in Toronto, Ontario, and are members of the East Division in the Canadian Football League (CFL). 

The franchise was founded as in 1873 and was a founding member of the Ontario Rugby Football Union in 1883 and of the Interprovincial Rugby Football Union in 1907. In their 144-year history, the team has appeared in 23 Grey Cup finals, and has won a league-high 17 championships. The franchise has had 59 head coaches in its history. The current Argonauts head coach is Ryan Dinwiddie, the current general manager is Michael Clemons, and the current owners are Maple Leaf Sports & Entertainment.

Key

Head coaches
  

Note: Statistics are current through the end of the 2022 CFL season.

Notes
 A running total of the number of coaches of the Argonauts. Thus, any coach who has two or more separate terms as head coach is only counted once.
 Each year is linked to an article about that particular CFL season.
 Entries prior to 1907 are taken from "Year-By-Year History" in the references. A consolidated list after 1907 is listed at "Toronto Argonauts All-Time Coaching."

References
General

Specific

Lists of Canadian Football League head coaches by team
Toronto Argonauts lists